Veet is a village in the Karmala taluka of Solapur district in Maharashtra state, India.

Demographics
Covering  and comprising 1087 households at the time of the 2011 census of India, Veet had a population of 5053. There were 2636 males and 2417 females, with 517 people being aged six or younger.

References

Villages in Karmala taluka